Dame Kathleen D'Olier Courtney, DBE ( – ) was a leader in the suffragist movement in the United Kingdom.

Life

Kathleen D'Olier Courtney was born the youngest of five daughters and the fifth of seven children of Lieutenant (later Major) David Charles Courtney (1845-1909) of the Royal Engineers (a native of Milltown, County Dublin, Ireland), and his wife, Alice Margaret (née Mann) at 1 York Terrace, was born in Gillingham on 11 March 1878.

Courtney was educated at the private the Anglo-French College in Kensington and the Manse boarding-school in Malvern before spending seven months in Dresden studying the German language. In January 1897 she went to Lady Margaret Hall to study modern languages. There she formed a lifetime friendship with Maude Royden.

The Courtney family were extremely wealthy, allowing Kathleen the freedom to devote her life to good causes. In 1908 she was appointed secretary of the North of England Society for Women's Suffrage. One of its members, Helena Swanwick, later revealed that Courtney arrived in Manchester "with a big reputation" as an outstanding organiser. 

In 1911, she moved to London where she worked closely with Millicent Fawcett, an English feminist, intellectual, political and union leader. She also became a writer and honorary secretary of the National Union of Women's Suffrage Societies. 

Upon the outbreak of World War I in 1914, she abandoned her active campaigning for women's suffrage and devoted her life to studying international politics and trying to build bridges towards international cooperation.

In April 1915, Aletta Jacobs, a suffragist in the Netherlands, invited suffrage members from around the world to an International Congress of Women in The Hague. The attendees included Mary Sheepshanks, Jane Addams, Grace Abbott, Lida Gustava Heymann, Emmeline Pethick-Lawrence, Emily Hobhouse, Chrystal Macmillan and Rosika Schwimmer. At the conference the women formed the Women's International League for Peace and Freedom (WIL). 

Courtney ultimately was elected as chair of the British section. In 1928, she became a member of the Executive Committee of the British League of Nations Union and in 1939 (the year World War II would begin) was elected Vice-Chairman. From 1949 to 1951 she served as Chairman. 

Courtney continued to be involved in the campaign for women's suffrage. She helped establish the Adult Suffrage Society in 1916 and as joint secretary she lobbied members of the House of Commons to extend the franchise until the Qualification of Women Act was passed in 1918. The following year she became vice-president of the National Union of Societies for Equal Citizenship. As well as advocating the same voting rights as men, the organisation also campaigned for equal pay, fairer divorce laws and an end to the discrimination against women in the professions.

In 1945, she became deputy of the United Nations Association rising four years later to be joint president and chair of the UNA's executive committee.

Courtney was appointed a CBE in 1946 and in 1972 she was promoted to DBE. In 1968 she had the honour of giving a talk in Westminster to celebrate 50 years of some women having the vote. 

In 1972 she was awarded the United Nations Peace Medal.

Death
Kathleen Courtney died at her home at 3 Elm Tree Court, London, on 7 December 1974 at age 96. She never married or had children. A memorial service was held on 11 April 1975 at St Martin-in-the-Fields.

References

1878 births
1974 deaths
19th-century British people
English suffragists
English women in politics
British women's rights activists
Pacifist feminists
British pacifists
Dames Commander of the Order of the British Empire
People from Gillingham, Kent
Alumni of Lady Margaret Hall, Oxford